Robert Andrew Mitchell was Dean of Lincoln from 1930 to 1949. Born in 1870, he was educated at Magdalen College, Oxford, and ordained  in 1893. His first post was as a curate at St Mary-at-the-Walls, Colchester, after which he was Vicar of Highfield, Hampshire then of St. Michael's Church, Chester Square, before his appointment to the Deanery.

Notes

1870 births
Alumni of Magdalen College, Oxford
Deans of Lincoln
1949 deaths